La peor de mis bodas 2 is a 2019 Peruvian comedy film directed by Adolfo Aguilar and written by Italo Carrera, Pablo Del Teso, Roberto Valdivieso & Sandro Ventura. It is a sequel to the 2016 film La peor de mis bodas. It is once again starring Maricarmen Marín and Gabriel Soto. It premiered on January 1, 2019 in Peruvian theaters.

Synopsis 
Maricielo and Salvador have been married for two happy years; but the arrival of the feared mother-in-law, a renowned judge in Mexico, will involve them in more entanglements.

Cast 
The actors participating in this film are:

 Maricarmen Marín as Maricielo
 Gabriel Soto as Salvador

 Laura Zapata as Dona Eleanor
 Carlos Casella as Juancito
 Darlene Rosas as Catalina
 Thiago Vernal as Ignacio
 Attilia Boschetti as Úrsula
 Carlos Palma as Fernando
 Analú Polanco as Silvia
 Francisco Cabrera as Rolando
 Sergio Galliani as Rubén
 Rodolfo Carrión as Hotel Guardian

Production 
The filming of the film was scheduled to begin in mid-2017, but was delayed. In mid-July 2018, the filming of the film began.

Reception 
It summoned more than 200,000 spectators in just two weeks.

Sequel 
At the end of August 2021, Adolfo Aguilar announced that a third part would be made entitled La peor de mis bodas 3 (The worst of my weddings 3), which will begin filming in March 2022. Its premiere is scheduled for July 27, 2023 in Peruvian theaters.

References

External links 

 

2019 films
2019 comedy films
Peruvian comedy films
Big Bang Films films
2010s Spanish-language films
2010s Peruvian films
Films set in Peru
Films shot in Peru
Films about weddings
Films about families
Peruvian sequel films